Delfo Bellini (13 January 1900 – 11 September 1953) was an Italian footballer who played as a defender. He competed in the 1928 Summer Olympics with the Italy national football team.

International career
Bellini was a member of the Italian national team that won the bronze medal in the 1928 Summer Olympic football tournament.

Honours

International 
Italy
Olympic Bronze Medal: 1928

References

External links
 
 
 
 
 Profile at Enciclopediadelcalcio.it
 

1900 births
1953 deaths
Association football defenders
Italian footballers
Footballers at the 1928 Summer Olympics
Olympic footballers of Italy
Olympic bronze medalists for Italy
Italy international footballers
Genoa C.F.C. players
Inter Milan players
U.C. Sampdoria players
Olympic medalists in football
Medalists at the 1928 Summer Olympics
People from Rivarolo Ligure